"Last Night" is an instrumental recorded by The Mar-Keys. Released in 1961, the track appeared on Last Night!, the first LP released by the Stax label.

Background
The label of the single gives writing credit simply to "Mar-Keys"; it was registered with BMI as having been written by Charles Axton, Floyd Newman, Gilbert C. Caple, Jerry Lee Smith and Chips Moman.

The song is in a twelve-bar blues form, with brief stops, where Floyd Newman intones "Last Night" before his saxophone solo, which is followed by him excaliming "Oh, yeah!" before the last three choruses, including the pauses, before the song's fade.

According to Steve Cropper, in an interview with Paul Nassari of the Sunday Mail newspaper, in Adelaide, Australia, "Jerry Lee ‘Smoochy’ Smith came up with the piano riff that was played on organ. Since [producer Chips] Moman didn't want a guitar on it for whatever reason, I wound up playing the hold-down on the organ on the root note. It hurts me in the Mar-Keys history when people say I wasn’t in the Mar-Keys because there’s no guitar on Last Night but I have to differ with them."

Chart performance
"Last Night" reached #3 Pop and #2 in the R&B charts in the United States.

Cover versions
The tune was covered by Georgie Fame on his 1966 Sweet Things album.
The Ventures released their take on the 1963 Dolton album The Ventures Play Telstar and the Lonely Bull, BST 8019.
Laurel Aitken & The Soulmen issued a 45 single version in 1966.
Ace Cannon opened his 1967 album Memphis Golden Hits with his version.
Screamin' Jay Hawkins released a risqué rendering titled "Bite it" on his record Because Is in Your Mind in 1970.

Samples
The tune was sampled in 'Last Night' by Chris Anderson and DJ Robbie, and featured on their album of the same name.
Multiple elements from the track were heavily borrowed in the Duffy's 2008 worldwide hit "Mercy".

Use in films, radio and television programs
During the 1960s, "Last Night" became the title tune for the French radio show Salut les Copains on Europe 1.
The music was used during telecasts of the NBA on CBS in the 1970s (roughly around 1975–76) as the play-by-play announcer gave a preview to the featured game.
The tune was covered by Georgie Fame on his 1966 Sweet Things album and by the jazz ensemble The Bum Notes for the closing credits of the BBC sitcom Bottom in the early 1990s. It was also used as the backing music to "Viaduct", a game played on the Chris Moyles radio show.
It is the theme tune to "The Midweek Special", a weekly show on Hospital Radio DGH in Eastbourne, England.
It featured in the 1988 Keanu Reeves film The Night Before.
It appeared in the 1998 film Blues Brothers 2000, re-recorded by the Blues Brothers Band, and during the closing credits of the 2007 film Rush Hour 3.
The music was also used in the legal comedy-drama Ally McBeal (1999, episode "Sideshow", second season).

References

1961 singles
CBS Sports
Songs written by Chips Moman
1961 songs
1960s instrumentals